Phonology: An Introduction to Basic Concepts is a 1984 book by Roger Lass designed for an introductory course in phonology.

Reception
The book was reviewed by Richard Coates, Larry M. Hyman, John R. Rennison and Ellen Broselow.

References

External links
Phonology: An Introduction to Basic Concepts

1984 non-fiction books
Phonology books
Linguistics textbooks
Cambridge University Press books